This list contains all of the different railway freight wagons used in New Zealand, by the New Zealand Railways Department, New Zealand Railways Corporation, Tranz Rail, ONTRACK, Toll Rail and KiwiRail. Kiwirail has about 4,585 wagons.

Classes L to M

Kiwirail wagons 
This is Kiwirail's list of their wagons -

Container wagons

Generators

References 

 http://nzrailwaysrollingstocklists.weebly.com/
 http://www.nzrsr.co.nz/

External links 
2017 Kiwirail container wagon specifications and restrictions
 

Freight wagons
Freight